George A. Godfrey (April 2, 1886 - April 17, 1974), was the general manager of the Orpheum Circuit in charge of bookings.

Biography
He was born on April 2, 1886. He replaced Edward Valentine Darling as the general manager for the Orpheum Circuit. In 1929 he became the head casting director for RKO Pictures. He died on April 17, 1974, at the Ankara Hotel in Miami Beach, Florida.

References

Vaudeville
1886 births
1974 deaths